La Granadella is a Spanish town (municipi) in the autonomous community of Catalonia. It is situated in the county of Garrigues, in the province of Lleida.

Description
The municipality covers an area of 89 km² (34 sq mi) and the population in 2014 was 715. As of 2006, it is twinned with the town of Pézilla-la-Rivière in the Pyrénées-Orientales department of France.

Its principal economic activity is agriculture, especially in growing olives, almonds and cereals. It secondary economic activity is processing these crops, especially in making olive oil.

It contains a primary school and a small secondary school.

Its baroque 18th-century parish church is dedicated to Saint Mary of Grace.

References

External links 

La Granadella 
 Government data pages 

Municipalities in Garrigues (comarca)
Populated places in Garrigues (comarca)